Görkem Sala (born 14 February 1992) is a Turkish singer, DJ, and hip hop artist. He was born in Eskişehir, He graduated from the Middle East Technical University, Department of Interior Architecture. For a period of time, he spent his time on designing after his graduation. He has been appreciated in a very short time with his music style, hip hop and Rap. His first albüm named His Diyarı was released on 13 January 2017 with songs named Jammu (Deluxe) and Salıncak.

References

1992 births
Living people
People from Eskişehir
Turkish-language singers
21st-century Turkish singers
21st-century Turkish male singers